The Anoual Formation is a geological formation in the High Atlas of Morocco. It is early Bathonian in age. It consists of two members. The lower member is several hundred metres thick, and consists largely of mudstone with lens beds of cross bedded sandstone, with thin intercalations of limestone that was deposited in a continental setting. The upper member is several tens of metres thick and consists of limestone deposited in a shallow marine setting. The formation is fossiliferous, with several of the limestone intercalations yielding a diverse fauna, including amphibians, reptiles, dinosaurs and mammals.

Paleobiota

Fish

Amphibians

Turtles

Lepidosaurs

Choristoderes

Dinosaurs

Pterosaurs

Crocodyliformes

Mammals

References 

Geologic formations of Morocco
Jurassic Morocco
Jurassic System of Africa
Bathonian Stage
Sandstone formations
Limestone formations
Marl formations
Mudstone formations
Paleontology in Morocco